Barbara Ras (born 1949 in New Bedford, Massachusetts) is an American poet, translator and publisher. Her most recent poetry collection is The Last Skin (Penguin Books, 2010), which was preceded by One Hidden Stuff (Penguin Books, 2006), and her first collection is Bite Every Sorrow (Louisiana State University Press, 1998).

Life
She graduated from Simmons College, and University of Oregon. She taught writing at Warren Wilson College.

She has been on the editorial staffs of Wesleyan University Press, the University Press of New England, the University of California Press, North Point Press and Sierra Club Books. She was Senior Editor acquiring environmental books for the University of Georgia Press. She was the Director of Trinity University Press San Antonio, Texas from 2002 to 2015. She lives with her husband; they have a daughter (b. 1984).

She has traveled extensively in Latin America and lived for periods of time in Colombia and Costa Rica.

Her work has appeared in literary journals and magazines including The New Yorker, Boulevard, Massachusetts Review, Prairie Schooner, American Scholar, and Spoon River Poetry Review.

She will be a Featured Presenter at the 2010 AWP.

Honors and awards
 2009 Guggenheim Fellowship
 1997 Walt Whitman Award, chosen by C. K. Williams
 Georgia Author of the Year Award for poetry.
 Ascher Montandon Award
 Kate Tufts Discovery Award
 honors from the National Writers Union, Villa Montalvo, San Jose Poetry Center.

Published works
Poetry Collections
 
 
 

Translations

References

External links
 Poem: Academy of American Poets > You cannot Have It All by Barbara Ras
 Poem: 

1949 births
Living people
Simmons University alumni
University of Oregon alumni
People from New Bedford, Massachusetts
Poets from Massachusetts
Warren Wilson College faculty
Wesleyan University people
American book editors
American publishers (people)
Poets from Texas
American women poets
American women academics
21st-century American women